Sheriff Mustapha Dibba (10 January 1937 – 2 June 2008) was a veteran Gambian politician who was the 1st Vice-President of the Gambia (1970–1972) and also served as the country's National Assembly speaker from 2002 to 2006. He was also leader of the National Convention Party (NCP).

Biography 
Dibba was the son of Mustapha Dibba, a Mandinka chief and farmer. His father would later become the district chief of Central Baddibu in 1967. He was born in Salikene, Central Baddibu in January 1937. He was educated at Armitage High School and then at the Methodist Boys High School in Bathurst from 1955 to 1957. He briefly worked as a clerk for the United Africa Company before resigning in 1959 to work for the recently formed People's Progressive Party (PPP). There he organized the party's youth wing and was elected to the House of Representatives as representative for the Central Baddibu constituency in the 1962 election. After the 1966 elections, he was appointed as Minister of Works and Communications and replaced Sheriff Sisay as Minister of Finance of the Gambia in December 1967.

When Gambia became a republic after the 1970 referendum, Dibba was appointed as vice president and continuing to serve as Finance Minister.

Dibba was the Gambia's first vice-president in 1970. He resigned from that position on 15 September 1972, as a result from the butut scandal, which his younger brother Kutubo was arrested for smuggling Gambian currency and contraband goods to neighbouring Senegal in August 1972 and found to have working out of Sheriff Dibba's official residence, No. 1 Marina. In October 1972, he was appointed as Gambia's first ambassador to the European Economic Community and in July 1974, he was recalled by President Jawara from Brussels and appointed as Minister of Economic Planning and Industrial Development. In late July 1975, Jawara accused Dibba of trying to unseat him through a cabinet revolt and Dibba was dismissed immediately. Dibba was later sacked from the PPP in August 1975. He later formed the National Convention Party (NCP) in 1975. Following elections in 1977, the NCP became the main opposition party in the Gambia.

He was arrested in August 1981, along with others NCP members and activists, and incarcerated for his alleged involvement in the foiled coup attempt that year, but was freed after 11 months in detention in July 1982.along with others NCP members and activists, A presidential election was held on 4 May 1982, months after a constitutional amendment instituting direct election of the country's head of state. Dibba was defeated by incumbent President Dawda Jawara. He ran again as the NCP presidential candidate in 1987 and 1992, placing second to Jawara both times.

Following the overthrow of the Jawara government in 1994, the NCP and other political parties were banned. The ban on the NCP was lifted in mid-2001 and Dibba contested the election held on 18 October of that year. He was defeated by incumbent President Yahya Jammeh and placed fourth out of five candidates, winning 3.8% of the vote.

Dibba then gave his support to Jammeh and his party, the Alliance for Patriotic Reorientation and Construction, and after the legislative elections of January 2002, he was elected Speaker of the National Assembly at the first meeting of the new legislature on 3 February.

In April 2006, Dibba was arrested for nine days and dismissed as speaker; he was allegedly linked to the coup attempt against Jammeh in the previous month. Dibba himself was over 65 years old by this time and was therefore not eligible to run. Nevertheless, after his release, he reaffirmed his loyalty to President Jammeh. He later retired from politics prior to his death.

He died from a heart attack at the Royal Victoria Teaching Hospital (RVTH) in Banjul on the morning of 2 June 2008, at the age of 71, after being hospitalized on 30 May.

References

Vice-presidents of the Gambia
Finance ministers of the Gambia
Speakers of the National Assembly of the Gambia
1937 births
2008 deaths
National Convention Party (Gambia) politicians
Alumni of Armitage High School
People from North Bank Division
People of Mandinka descent
Prisoners and detainees of the Gambia